Christoph Wölfflin (1625–1688) was a Lutheran theologian of Germany.

Life 
Christoph Wölfflin was born in Würtemberg, either at Owen, or at Kirchheim unter Teck, on 23 December 1625. He moved to Tübingen and studied at the university there, was in 1651 deacon at Aurach, in 1657 at Tübingen, in 1659 professor of Greek, and in 1660 was made doctor and professor of theology. 

In 1669 Duke Eberhard III appointed him court preacher, and provost of Lorch. In 1680 Duke Frederic Charles appointed him provost of Stuttgart, a position which has never again been occupied after Wölfflin. 

He died at Stuttgart on 30 October 1688.

Works 

 Exercitationes 8 de Lapsu Adami;
 Exercitt. 7 de Obligatione Credendi in Christum;
 Exercitt. 5 de Poenitentia Tyriorum et Sidoniorum;
 Dissert. de Triduo Mortis Christi;
 Historia Incestus Lothi.

References

Sources 

 Holtz, Sabine (1993). Theologie und Alltag: Lehre und Leben in den Predigten der Tübinger Theologen 1550–1750. Tübingen: J. C. B. Mohr (Paul Siebeck). pp. 437–439.

Attribution:

 Pick, B. (1887). "Wölfflin, Christoph". In McClintock, John; Strong, James (eds.). Cyclopædia of Biblical, Theological and Ecclesiastical Literature. Supplement.—Vol. 2. New York: Harper & Brothers. p. 963. 

1625 births
1688 deaths
17th-century German Lutheran clergy
17th-century German Protestant theologians
17th-century German writers
People from Württemberg